Adrian Kivumbi Ddungu (15 July 1923 – 30 December 2009) was a Ugandan Catholic priest who served as the second bishop of the Diocese of Masaka, in Uganda, from 11 November 1961 until 10 January 1998.

Background and priesthood
He was born on 15 July 1923 to Petero Lugwana and Bulandina Nnakabugo Basanyukira, at Ssango Village, in present-day Rakai District.

He attended Nkoni Primary School, located at Nkoni, approximately  along the Masaka–Mbarara Road. Between 1939 and 1946, Ddungu studied at Bukalasa Minor Seminary "where he excelled". He was admitted to Katigondo Major Seminary in 1946 but studied there for only 10 months before he left for further studies in Rome, Italy. Ddungu was ordained to the priesthood on 20 December 1952, serving as a priest of Masaka, until 11 November 1961.

As bishop
He was appointed bishop by Pope John XXIII on 11 November 1961, and was consecrated as Bishop of Masaka on 18 March 1962, by 
Archbishop Joseph Nakabaale Kiwánuka†, Archbishop of Rubaga, assisted by Bishop Vincent Billington, 
Bishop of Kampala and Bishop Vincent Joseph McCauley, Bishop of Fort Portal. Ddungu retired as Bishop of Masaka on 10 January 1998.

In October 2009, Bishop Ddungu suffered a major stroke and was admitted to St. Francis Hospital Nsambya, in Kampala, Uganda's capital city. While at the hospital, his health deteriorated and he died on 30 December 2009, at the age of 86 years and 5 months.

Succession table

References

External links
 Profile of the Roman Catholic Diocese of Masaka

1923 births
2009 deaths
20th-century Roman Catholic bishops in Uganda
People from Rakai District
Roman Catholic bishops of Masaka
Ugandan Roman Catholic bishops